The 477th Bombardment Squadron is an inactive United States Air Force unit.  It last was assigned to the 335th Bombardment Group, stationed at Barksdale Army Airfield, Louisiana.  It was inactivated on 1 May 1944.

History
Established in 1942 as a B-26 Marauder Operational Training Unit.    Inactivated in 1944.

Lineage
 Constituted 477th Bombardment Squadron (Medium) on 9 July 1942
 Activated on 17 July 1942
 Disbanded on 1 May 1944

Assignments
 335th Bombardment Group, 17 July 1942 – 1 May 1944

Stations
 Barksdale Army Airfield, Louisiana, 17 July 1942 – 1 May 1944.

Aircraft
 B-26 Marauder, 1942–1944

References

 

Bombardment squadrons of the United States Army Air Forces